Central Carolina Community College is a public community college with campuses in Chatham, Harnett and Lee counties. It is part of the North Carolina Community College System. It offered its first classes in 1961.

Academics
Central Carolina Community College offers Associate in Arts, Associate in Science, and Associate in Applied Science degrees. Many students take their first two years of college at Central Carolina, then transfer to a four-year institution. One-year, or shorter, vocational and academic programs lead to a diploma or certificate. The college also offers non-curriculum credit courses in Adult Basic Education and other adult education courses in technical, vocational, academic, and general interest areas. The college's vocational training programs provide nurses, early childhood teachers, police officers, bioprocessing technicians, and many other essential skilled workers. In partnership with Lee County Public Schools, the college is home to Lee Early College. In the five-year program, students earn both a high school diploma and an associate degree.

It has one of the few Laser-Photonics Technology programs at a community college in the United States. It also offers the only Alternative Energy Technology: Biofuels degree program at a North Carolina community college. Central Carolina also provides extensive training support to business and industry through its Industrial Relations Office and three Small Business Centers. The college's athletic program is known as the Cougars.

Campuses

Lee County Campus
Central Carolina Community College's Lee County Campus is located in Sanford, North Carolina. It has  of classroom, shop, and laboratory space, plus a full-service library and an Academic Assistance Center.  The campus includes the  Dennis A. Wicker Civic Center, with its large exhibition hall, auditorium, and conference/classrooms. Other college facilities in Lee County include the  North Carolina School of Telecommunications, the  Emergency Services Training Center, and the Jonesboro Center for adult education.

Harnett County Campus
The Harnett County Campus is located between Lillington and Buies Creek, NC. The campus has  of instructional floor space, plus a full-service library and an Academic Assistance Center. The Triangle South Enterprise Center, in Dunn, is a joint venture of the college, Dunn Committee of 100, and Harnett County. It provides space for classes and serves as a small business incubator, as well as housing one of the college's Small Business Centers. The college also operates a cosmetology school in Dunn and has an  Center in the Western Harnett Industrial Park.

Chatham County Campus
The Chatham County Campus is located in Pittsboro, North Carolina. It has  of instructional space, plus a full-service library and an Academic Assistance Center. A  Sustainable Technologies Classroom and Lab Building is being added to house the sustainable agriculture, alternative fuel technology, and green building programs, as well as to provide space for culinary training and arts instruction. A  joint College-Chatham County library is being constructed. The college's Professional Arts and Crafts: Sculpture program is located in Siler City, North Carolina.

External links
Official website

Two-year colleges in the United States
North Carolina Community College System colleges
Educational institutions established in 1961
Universities and colleges accredited by the Southern Association of Colleges and Schools
Education in Lee County, North Carolina
Education in Chatham County, North Carolina
Education in Harnett County, North Carolina
Buildings and structures in Lee County, North Carolina
Buildings and structures in Chatham County, North Carolina
Buildings and structures in Harnett County, North Carolina
1961 establishments in North Carolina
NJCAA athletics